Markus Jürgenson (born 9 September 1987) is an Estonian professional footballer who last played as a right back for Estonian club FCI Levadia.

Club career

Tammeka
Jürgenson came through the youth system at Tammeka. He made his debut in the Meistriliiga on 16 March 2005, in a 2–2 home draw against Merkuur.

TVMK
In December 2006, Jürgenson signed a three-year contract with TVMK.

Flora
On 16 November 2008, Jürgenson signed with Flora. He won his first Meistriliiga title in the 2010 season. Jürgenson won two more league titles in 2011 and 2015. On 8 November 2016, Flora announced Jürgenson's contract would not be extended for the next season. During his eight seasons with the club, Jürgenson had become a fans' favourite, having won three Meistriliiga titles, four Estonian Cups and five Estonian Supercups, amassing a total of 328 appearances and scoring 56 goals, including 252 appearances and 37 goals in the Meistriliiga.

VPS
On 10 February 2017, Jürgenson signed with Finnish club VPS on a one-year contract, with option of another.

FCI Levadia
On 19 January 2018, Jürgenson returned to Estonia and joined FCI Levadia on a one-year deal with an option to extend the contract for another year. In November 2022 Jürgenson announced his departure from Levadia after five seasons and five titles with the club: 1 League title, 2 cups and 2 supercups.

International career
Jürgenson began his international career for Estonia with the under-21 national team in 2006. In December 2010, he was called up by manager Tarmo Rüütli for Estonia friendlies against China PR and Qatar. Jürgenson made his senior international debut for Estonia on 18 December, playing full 90 minutes in a 0–3 away loss to China PR.

Career statistics

Club

International

Honours

Club
Flora
Meistriliiga: 2010, 2011, 2015
Estonian Cup: 2008–09, 2010–11, 2012–13, 2015–16
Estonian Supercup: 2009, 2011, 2012, 2014, 2016

FCI Levadia
Estonian Cup: 2017–18
Estonian Supercup: 2018

References

External links

1987 births
Living people
People from Nõo Parish
Estonian footballers
Association football defenders
Esiliiga players
Meistriliiga players
Tartu JK Tammeka players
FC TVMK players
FC Flora players
FCI Levadia Tallinn players
Veikkausliiga players
Vaasan Palloseura players
Estonia youth international footballers
Estonia under-21 international footballers
Estonia international footballers
Estonian expatriate footballers
Estonian expatriate sportspeople in Finland
Expatriate footballers in Finland